Nicolas Barthélémy (born 7 September 1990) is a French professional footballer who plays as a midfielder for Championnat National 2 club Rouen.

Career
Barthélémy spent 16 years at Pacy Vallée-d'Eure, the same club his grandfather played for, before moving to Dieppe in 2015. On 9 June 2015, he joined Quevilly-Rouen after years of being scouted for the team by the manager Emmanuel da Costa. Barthélémy made his professional debut for Quevilly-Rouen in a 1–0 Coupe de la Ligue loss to Orléans on 8 August 2017. He made his Ligue 2 debut in a 1–0 victory over Orléans on 17 November 2017.

In May 2019, Berthélémy joined Rouen for the 2019–20 season.

References

External links
 
 L'Equipe Profile
 LFP Profile
 QRM Profile

1990 births
Living people
Sportspeople from Évreux
French footballers
Pacy Ménilles RC players
FC Dieppe players
US Quevilly-Rouen Métropole players
FC Rouen players
Ligue 2 players
Championnat National players
Championnat National 2 players
Championnat National 3 players
Association football midfielders
Footballers from Normandy